The Page Organ Company was an American manufacturer of theater pipe organs, located in Lima, Ohio.

The Page Company started very small, with a home-built organ in 1922. However, the company experienced much growth over the following decade, with a steady demand for theatre organs.

The company experienced a decline in the early 1930s with the introduction of sound films, coupled with the onset of the Depression. The company was sold to an employee named Ellsworth Beilharz in 1930, who initially assembled instruments from components purchased from the defunct Page Company.

In 1984, Beilharz sold the company to two employees, who remain in business under the name Lima Pipe Organ Company, Inc.

Current organ installations 
This list is incomplete. You can help by expanding it.

 Catalina Casino, Avalon, California
 Embassy Theatre, Fort Wayne, Indiana
 The Hedback Community Theatre in Indianapolis has a Page/Wurlitzer organ.
 Paramount Theatre, Anderson, Indiana
 Stephenson High School, DeKalb County, Georgia
 The Sandusky State Theatre Sandusky, Ohio

References

External links
American Theatre Organ Society

Companies based in Ohio
Pipe organ building companies
American companies established in 1922
Musical instrument manufacturing companies of the United States